The Beardmore Crane was a giant cantilever crane at the William Beardmore and Company yard.

Design

From the job to the ground extended a tapering lattice, which was enclosed by a lattice tower. The jib was slewed by a mechanism on the ground, and bearings at the top of the tower and where the extension met the ground allowed it to turn. The winch on each arm was powered by two  electric motors for hoisting and two  motors for slewing, and a  motor for slewing. The tower took eight minutes to make a full revolution.

Railway tracks running beneath the crane allowed material to be moved from the workshops.

It was used for fitting out ships, installing very heavy items such as boilers, armour and guns. The basin it served was the largest in the world at the time of its completion.

History
The crane was built by Benrather Maschinenfabrik near Düsseldorf, now Demag, and is similar to a crane built for Vickers in Barrow-in-Furness. The two cranes were the first modern high capacity cranes in Britain. Other shipbuilders installed massive cranes soon after, such as the Titan Clydebank in 1907, although these were typically British-built and of a different design.

The crane was erected in 1903 at a cost of £3,352 by German firm Kohncke. The yard was short-lived, lasting from 1899-1930, but saw significant action during the First World War when it built a number of ships for the Royal Navy.

The Beardmore Crane was demolished .

References

Sources
 

Individual cranes (machines)
Shipyard cranes
Clydebank